West Ham United F.C. supporters are the followers of the London-based West Ham United Football Club, who were founded as Thames Ironworks in 1895. There are 700,000 fans on the club's database and over 2,300,000 likes on Facebook. The club's website is in the top ten most visited websites for English football clubs by people in the USA. Their fans are also associated with a once-notorious hooligan element and have long-standing rivalries with several other clubs, most notably Millwall.

Demographics 
West Ham have a larger than average number of male fans.

West Ham is the only club in the borough of Newham and a majority of fans in the borough support West Ham. Their home match average attendance over the last six seasons was in excess of 33,000 per season and despite finishing in bottom place in the Premier League for the 2010–11 season, their home attendance averaged 33,426, eleventh highest of all Premier League clubs. Traditionally, West Ham fans are drawn from London (in particular East London) and the home counties, especially Essex; however, there are fans clubs around the world, notably in New York City, Barcelona, Tenerife, Serbia, Australia, New Zealand, and Scandinavia, which has over 800 members.

Songs
In addition to the usual English football chants, West Ham fans sing "I'm Forever Blowing Bubbles". The song is considered to be the club's anthem.
Songs and chants have also been created and sung for players, notably Paolo Di Canio, Christian Dailly, Bobby Zamora, Frank Lampard Pop Robson, Dimitri Payet and Luděk Mikloško

Heroes and villains

West Ham fans have identified several players over the years as being 'fans favourites', notably
Paolo Di Canio, Bobby Moore, Julian Dicks and Carlos Tevez.

West Ham fans have also displayed a zeal for abusing former players who are perceived to have abandoned the club, or performed some disservice. Famously Dimitri Payet as well as Paul Ince, Frank Lampard, Jermain Defoe, Craig Bellamy and Nigel Reo-Coker have borne the brunt of verbal abuse and a hostile reception at Upton Park and now London Stadium. However, players such as Joe Cole, Michael Carrick, Rio Ferdinand, Bobby Zamora and Carlos Tévez receive applause and even standing ovations in honour of their contributions for the club.

Rivalries

West Ham fans' longest-running and deepest rivalry is with Millwall fans with both sets of supporters considering the other as their main rival.

The rivalry between Millwall and West Ham has always been a fierce encounter, from the first meeting – a 'friendly' on 23 September 1897, which the newly formed Thames Ironworks (not yet known as West Ham) lost 2–0 – up until their most recent meeting in a Championship clash in February 2012.

On 17 September 1906 in a Western League game, a particularly ferocious encounter saw one player hurled against a metal advertising board and others being stretchered off following heavy tackles. The East Ham Echo reported: "From the very first kick of the ball it was seen likely to be some trouble, but the storm burst when Dean and Jarvis came into collision (Millwall had two players sent off during the match). This aroused considerable excitement among the spectators. The crowds on the bank having caught the fever, free fights were plentiful."

In 1926 the General Strike was observed by workers in the East End, who were mainly West Ham supporters, but the Millwall-supporting shipyard workers of the Isle of Dogs refused to lend their support, provoking mass outrage.

In 1972, a testimonial for Millwall defender Harry Cripps was marred by intense fighting between the two club's "firms", groups of hooligans intent on violence.

Four years later, a Millwall supporter, Ian Pratt, died at New Cross station after falling out of a train during a fight with West Ham fans. Leaflets were later distributed at Millwall's home matches bearing the words: "A West Ham fan must die to avenge him".
During a League Cup game on 25 August 2009, violent clashes transpired between the two sets of supporters' outside Upton Park. Police estimated hundreds of fans were involved. Millwall supporter Alan Baker was stabbed and left fighting for his life. The pitch was invaded three times by West Ham supporters, causing play to be suspended. The Football Association charged both clubs, investigated the aftermath and eventually fined West Ham £115,000. They were found to have failed to ensure their fans refrained from violent, threatening, obscene and provocative behaviour and from entering the field of play. Millwall were cleared of all charges.

Violence among fans at matches between the two clubs can become so intense that there have been calls to never again allow games between the two in cup competitions and that any future league games be played behind closed doors.

Matches against other London sides, such as Chelsea and Tottenham Hotspur are also derbies and violence has occurred between fans although the rivalry is not as intense as that between West Ham and Millwall.

Traditions

West Ham's ground is currently in Stratford, East London. Previously they played at the Boleyn Ground, near the junction of Green Street and the Barking Road in Newham. At the junction is the Boleyn public house, traditionally used by West Ham fans on match days. Visiting fans have been made unwelcome and violence has occurred in this area. Due to its proximity to the ground and its use by West Ham fans, the pub has often been boarded-up before and after games with clubs who have a rivalry with West Ham.
West Ham fans also used the Greengate, Wine Bar and Village pubs on Barking Road and the Duke of Edinburgh pub at the junction of Green Street and Plashet Grove.

Fanzines
Starting in the late 1980s there have been many fanzines aimed at West Ham fans. These have included The Cockney Pride, The EastEnd Connection, The Loyal Supporter, UTD United, The Boleyn Scorcher, Never Mind the Boleyn, Forever Blowing Bubbles, Ultimate Truth, We Ate All the Pies, Fortunes Always Hiding, The Ultimate Dream, On a Mission From God, The Water in Majorca, On the Terraces and Over Land and Sea. Only the last of these is still in publication.

Racism, violence and hooliganism
Certain factions of West Ham's supporters have a tradition of violence and hooliganism. Their former ground, Upton Park, has also witnessed racism amongst fans and here football hooliganism originated amongst bovver boys in the 1960s. Sympathisers of the National Front handed out National Front leaflets outside Upton Park, particularly following the launch of the National Front youth newspaper Bulldog in 1977, and successfully sold club memorabilia carrying 'NF' slogans and motifs.

The origins of West Ham's links with organised football-related violence started in the 1960s with the establishment of The Mile End Mob (named after a particularly tough area of the East End of London).

During the 1970s and 1980s (the main era for organised football-related violence), West Ham gained further notoriety for the levels of hooliganism in their fan base and antagonistic behaviour towards both their own and rival fans, and the police. During the 1970s in particular, rival groups of West Ham fans from neighbouring areas (most often groups from the districts of Barking and Dagenham) often fought each other at games.

In 1980 the club were forced to play their Cup Winners Cup game against Castilla behind closed doors to an empty ground after fans rioted at the away leg of the tie in the Bernabeu. In 1985, five fans were stabbed on a cross-channel ferry to France after fighting involving fans of West Ham, Manchester United and Everton.

In 2006, twenty West Ham fans appeared in an Italian court following their arrest after fights with rival supporters in Sicily before and after West Ham's game against Palermo in the away leg of their 2006–07 UEFA Cup game. At the home leg fans had bought T-shirts bearing the slogan "the Mafia" – a reference to Sicily being the home of the Cosa Nostra. This was seen as antagonistic by Palermo fans. Six West Ham fans, six police officers and five locals suffered minor injuries in fighting in Sicily. Rival fans threw bottles and chairs in the city's Teatro Massimo district. 500 people were involved in the brawl and police officers were attacked. It took police in riot gear more than an hour to bring the violence under control. An eyewitness said, "West Ham fans behaved like animals, roaming the streets, bottles in hand searching for anyone to fight". More than 2,500 West Ham fans travelled to Palermo for the game.

Inter City Firm

Mainly active in the 1970s, 1980s and 1990s, West Ham fans formed the Inter City Firm ('ICF'), an English football hooligan firm associated with the club. They were one of the most feared hooligan 'firms'.
The name came from the use of InterCity trains for away games.
The ICF were one of the first "casuals", so called because they avoided police supervision by not wearing football-related clothing. Fans' violent activities were not confined to local derbies – the hooligans were content to cause trouble at any game, though nearby teams often bore the brunt.
During the 1990s, and to the present day, sophisticated surveillance and policing, coupled with club-supported promotions and community action, have reduced the level of violence, although the rivalry with Millwall, Tottenham Hotspur and Chelsea remains.

Protest and pitch invasions
West Ham fans have taken part in pitch invasions and protests against the club's board of directors and their perceived financial mismanagement, after poor performances on the pitch or to show disapproval at the sale or purchase of players such as Lee Bowyer. Other notable pitch invasions took place in the 1990s against West Ham's launch of The Hammer's Bond, a debenture which would have forced fans into the purchase of a bond before they could buy a season ticket. In 1992, a post-match demonstration by fans against the scheme and new managing director, Peter Storrie, before a home game against Wimbledon was followed by pitch invasions in home games against Everton and Arsenal. The West Ham board of directors were influenced by the fans' protest and announced that the purchase of a bond would no longer be required in order to buy a season ticket. Of 19,301 bonds originally available less than 1,000 were sold.

Mass protests also took place at West Ham's home game against Burnley in 2018 to protest against the lack of investment from the board. 4 fans entered the pitch during play, one of whom carried the corner flag to the centre circle, and roughly 200 fans gathered around the directors box, aiming their anger at the joint chairmen David Sullivan and David Gold, both of whom were later escorted away. During the 2019–20 season, 900 supporters protested against the club's board ahead of a 1–1 draw against Everton. On 29 February 2020, 2,500 supporters staged a protest march along the Greenway in Newham, once again protesting against Sullivan, Gold and Karren Brady's ownership of the club.

In modern culture
West Ham United is frequently mentioned among the locals at The Queen Victoria tavern in the BBC soap opera EastEnders, created by Tony Holland and Julia Smith. The show is set in the London Borough of Walford, which is a portmanteau of the East End areas of Walthamstow and Stratford. The soap opera focuses on characters moving in and out of the borough, as well as coining the matter of family values. EastEnders has maintained an avid following, least of all with the charismatic Fowler family.

The 2005 film Green Street Hooligans (an allusion to the road on which the Boleyn Ground stands) depicted an American student, played by Elijah Wood, becoming involved with a fictional firm associated with West Ham, with an emphasis on the rivalry with Millwall. Although they originally allowed filming inside West Ham's ground, the directors of West Ham withdrew their permission once they became aware of the violent content of the film.

West Ham hooliganism was again highlighted in the 2008 film Cass, based on the life of well-known former hooligan Cass Pennant.

Olympic Stadium
Following the building of the Olympic Stadium in Stratford, London for the 2012 Summer Olympics West Ham United put forward proposals which would see the club leave their Boleyn Ground location and relocate to Stratford. On 22 March 2013, West Ham secured a 99-year lease deal, with the stadium planned to be used as their home ground from the 2016–2017 season. West Ham United supporters backed these proposals with 85% in favour of a move in a poll conducted by YouGov, in May 2013.

List of notable supporters 
Below is a list of people who are known West Ham United supporters:

Notes
  Other sources cite her as being a fan of Arsenal.
  Other sources cite him as once being a fan of Arsenal.

References

External links
 Knees up Mother Brown – the web's longest-running WHUFC supporters website
  West Ham forum, a WHUFC supporters website

Supporters
Association football supporters
English football supporters' associations